The Indianapolis Jets were a Basketball Association of America (BAA) team based in Indianapolis. They were founded as the Indianapolis Kautskys and used that name until the team joined the BAA. They played for one year in the BAA and then ceased operations due to the formation of the Indianapolis Olympians.

Franchise history
In 1931, Frank Kautsky, an Indianapolis grocer, formed a professional basketball team and named it the Indianapolis Kautskys. After playing in the Midwest Basketball Conference (1932–33) and the National Basketball League (1935–37), the Kautskys became one of the original members of the newly formed National Basketball League (NBL) in 1937.

1946-47 was the best season for the franchise; led by Arnie Risen, they set the franchise mark for most wins (27) and won the World Professional Basketball Tournament.

With the Minneapolis Lakers, Rochester Royals, and Fort Wayne Pistons, the team moved to the Basketball Association of America (BAA) for the 1948–49 season. At that time the team's name was changed to the Indianapolis Jets because the BAA prevented its teams from having commercial sponsors, similar to how the Fort Wayne Pistons removed the Zollner sponsor from their original name.

Following the 1948–49 season, the Jets folded. This coincided with the BAA and the NBL merging to form the National Basketball Association (NBA). For the 1949–50 season, a new Indianapolis franchise, the Indianapolis Olympians, was created.

Season-by-season records

|-
!colspan="6"|Indianapolis Kautskys (MBC)
|-
|1935–36 ||9||3||0.750||Round Robin Tourney ||
|-
|1936–37 ||2||5||0.286||Did not qualify ||
|-
!colspan="6"|Indianapolis Kautskys (NBL)
|-
|1937–38 ||4||9||0.308||Did not qualify ||
|-
|1938–39 ||13||13||0.500||Did not qualify ||
|-
|1939–40 ||9||19||0.321||Did not qualify||
|-
|1941–42 ||12||11||0.522||0–2 ||
|-
|1945–46 ||10||22||0.312||Did not qualify||
|-
|1946–47 ||27||17||0.614||2–3||
|-
|1947–48 ||24||35||0.407||1–3|| 
|-
!colspan="6"|Indianapolis Jets (BAA)
|-
|1948–49 ||18||42||0.300||Did not qualify|| 
|-

Players

Ernie Andres
George Chestnut
Norman Cottom
Gene Cramer
Gus Doerner
Glynn Downey
Hal Gensichen
Bruce Hale
Bob Kessler
Branch McCracken
Charles "Stretch" Murphy
William Perigo
Cy Proffitt 
Arnie Risen
Herm Schaefer 
Dave Strack
Earl Thomas
John Wooden
Jewell Young
Ash Resnick

Basketball Hall of Famers

References

 
Defunct National Basketball Association teams
Basketball teams in Indianapolis
Basketball Association of America teams
Basketball teams established in 1931
Basketball teams disestablished in 1949
1931 establishments in Indiana
1949 disestablishments in Indiana